SV, Sv, sv, etc. may refer to:

Places and language
 El Salvador, ISO 3166-1 country code SV
 South Vietnam, an extinct state
 Svalbard, Norway, FIPS country code SV
 Swedish language, ISO 639-1 language code sv
 Silicon Valley, a region in northern California noted for high tech and social media companies (e.g., Apple Inc., Google, Facebook)

Science and technology
 Sensitivity priority, or Sv (for "sensitivity value"), a camera setting
 Sievert, symbol Sv, a unit of ionizing radiation dose
 Starting variable, or initialization vector, in cryptography
 Stroke volume, in cardiovascular physiology
 .sv, a filename extension of SystemVerilog files
 .sv, the Internet country code top-level domain for El Salvador
 Svedberg unit, symbol S or Sv, a non-metric unit for sedimentation coefficient
 Sverdrup, symbol Sv, a non-SI unit of flow

Sport
 Save (baseball), abbreviated SV
 Sportverein ('sports club'), for example Hamburger SV
 Save percentage, SV%, a statistic in many sports

Vehicles
 MG XPower SV, a sports car by MG Rover
 Super veloce, a variety of Lamborghini car such as the Lamborghini Aventador SV, Lamborghini Murcielago SV, Lamborghini Diablo SV, or Lamborghini Miura SV 
 The S-V stage used on the Saturn I rocket during the Apollo program
 Name prefix of ships SV or S/V for sailing vessel

Other uses
 ESP SV, a series of electric guitars produced by ESP
 Pokémon Scarlet and Violet, Pokémon video games released in 2022
 Saudia, Saudi Arabian Airlines, IATA code SV
Shareholder value
 Significantly viewed out-of-market television stations in the United States, a classification for television stations
 Silver Line (Washington Metro)
 Socialist Left Party (Norway), a political party
 Slovaks Forward (Slováci vpred), a political party in Serbia
 sub verbo or sub voce, a Latin phrase, 'under the word/heading'
 Stattkus-Verzeichnis, a catalogue of the musical works of Claudio Monteverdi
 Supplementary vote, an electoral system

See also